Bralirwa, also known by its French name Brasseries et Limonaderies du Rwanda, is the largest brewer and soft beverage company in Rwanda. Its shares of stock are listed on the Rwanda Stock Exchange, where they trade under the symbol:BLRW. As of December 2017, the company's total assets were valued at RWF:127.73 billion (approximately US$149.72 million), with shareholders' equity of RWF:35.7 billion (US$41.83 million).

History
The history of Bralirwa goes back to 1957. The management of the breweries of the Congo and Burundi, then under the management of Brasseries de Leopoldville (Brewery of Kinshasa), decided to build another brewery in the Eastern region. The city of Gisenyi, on the northern shores of Lake Kivu, was selected to house the new brewery. Gisenyi was selected for two reasons: (a) It was easily accessible, by water, land and air and (b) Lake Kivu has a large quantity of proven reserves of methane gas, a source of alternative energy. The brewery became operational in 1959 and began producing Primus beer, the only brand produced until 1987. In 1987, a new premium local beer brand, Mützig was introduced. In 1989, Bralirwa began making Guinness under license.

In 1971, the Heineken Group, a Dutch brewing  conglomerate, acquired a 70 percent majority shareholding  in Bralirwa. With the acquisition, Bralirwa greatly improved its brewing process. In 1974, Bralirwa diversified into the production of soft drinks. A soft beverages plant was opened in Kigali, Rwanda's capital and largest city. The brewer partnered with the Coca-Cola Company, which allowed Bralirwa to widen the range of products manufactured.

As of 2018, Bralirwa is a regionally and internationally recognized brewer and soft beverage manufacturer with an expanding portfolio of alcoholic and non-alcoholic beverages.

Ownership
The shares of stock of the company are listed on the Rwanda Stock Exchange (RSE), where they trade under the symbol BLRW. The Heineken Group owns 75 percent of the shares of the company. The remaining 25 percent are owned by individual and institutional investors. In December 2009, the Government of Rwanda successfully divested from the company by selling 5 percent shareholding directly to the Heineken Group and by listing the remaining 25 percent on the RSE, through an initial public offering (IPO). , the ownership of the company stock is as depicted in the table below:

Governance
As of December 2017, the members of the board of directors of Bralirwa included the following individuals:

 Boudewijn Haarsma: Chairman 
 Victor Madiela: Managing Director
 Chantal Mubarure: Non-Executive Director
 George Gakuba: Non-Executive Director
 John Bosco Sebabi: Non-Executive Director  
 Jordi Borrut Bel: Non-Executive Director
 Hubert Eze: Non-Executive Director.

Operations

The administrative headquarters of the company are located in Kigali. Also located in Kigali is the Soft Beverages Plant, where Coca-Cola carbonated beverages of are manufactured under license. In May 2011, press reports indicated that the company was in the process of establishing a new soft drinks manufacturing line at the company's plant in Kicukiro, a suburb of Kigali, and upgrading its brewing plant in Gisenyi.

Brands
The brands manufactured by Bralirwa include:

Beers
 Primus
 Primus Citron
 Turbo King
 Huza
 Mützig, a 5.5% ABV lager; launched in 1987.
 Mützig Lite
 Heineken
 Amstel
 Legend

Soft drinks
 Coca-Cola
 Coca-Cola-Zero
 Fanta : Orange, Citron, Fiesta, Pineapple
 Sprite
 Krest Tonic
 Soda-Water
 Cheetah-Energy-drink

See also
 Republic of Rwanda
 Economy of Rwanda
 Western Province, Rwanda

References

External links 
 Homepage
 Heineken Homepage 
 Rwanda’s Bralirwa Gets KSh2.5 Billion Loan To Fund Expansion

Photos
 Bralirwa Brewery in Gisenyi 

Drink companies of Rwanda
Companies listed on the Rwanda Stock Exchange
1957 establishments in Ruanda-Urundi
Heineken subsidiaries 
Organisations based in Kigali
Coca-Cola bottlers
Food and drink companies established in 1957
Breweries of Africa